Alan Mcilwraith (born 3 March 1978) is a Scottish former call centre worker from Glasgow who was exposed as a military impostor by a tabloid newspaper after he passed himself off as a much-decorated British Army officer.

He convinced a number of charities and media outlets that he was "Captain Sir Alan Mcilwraith, KBE, DSO, MC". The National Children's Home charity invited him to the Women of Influence Awards at the Barony Halls. Celebrity magazine No1 carried a picture of him which was captioned "Lady Shona [McLaughlan] and Sir Alan McIlwraith", showing him wearing the dress uniform of the Parachute Regiment with medals.

Mcilwraith's entry in Wikipedia
An article about Alan Mcilwraith was created on Wikipedia on 5 October 2005:

Mcilwraith also uploaded to Wikipedia a photograph of himself wearing military uniform and medals (see above). The article was created from an IP address registered to AOL, but Mcilwraith also apparently edited the article under the Wikipedia username MilitaryPro. On 10 October 2005 the article was tagged as needing citations for verification, and on 20 October 2005 the article was tagged for deletion due to concerns about its reliability. The article was deleted three times and protected from recreation on 17 February 2006. When news of the hoax broke in April 2006 the article was revived, stating that the previous versions had been written by Mcilwraith himself.

When the article was created, Mcilwraith was described as a CBE, but by December 2005 he had purportedly been elevated to the rank of KBE. On 4 October 2005, MilitaryPro added the name of Alan Mcilwraith to the List of honorary British Knights in Wikipedia.

Exposure
Mcilwraith's double life was exposed by the Scottish tabloid newspaper the Daily Record in an article on 11 April 2006 which described him as "Sir Walter Mitty". The newspaper contacted the British Army and Buckingham Palace during its investigation into Mcilwraith's status, but both denied knowledge of him. An Army spokesperson was quoted by the newspaper as saying, "I can confirm he is a fraud. He has never been an officer, soldier or Army cadet. May I suggest you try the space cadet organisation." Mcilwraith later said that "the lie had just gone too deep, it's like a weed that invades your life. Once it's taken root, there's nothing you can do about it."

Mcilwraith the magician

In December 2007, the Sunday Mail reported that Mcilwraith had reinvented himself as a magician. When confronted by the Sunday Mail, he said: "I've been very stupid. It was all lies and for that I apologise. I should have stopped lying after I got caught last time but I just really wanted to be taken seriously as a magician. I won't ever do this again."

Mcilwraith the property tycoon
In June 2009, Mcilwraith received fresh coverage in the Daily Record, which reported that he had been passing himself off as a millionaire property tycoon and charity worker to students at Strathclyde University. The paper also claimed that Mcilwraith had asked some students for disclosure documents and taken their National Insurance numbers and other details after duping them into filling in recruitment forms.

When a journalist from the Record met Mcilwraith at Glasgow Central Station, he was wearing "striking blue" contact lenses. Mcilwraith claimed he was working for an agency that housed asylum seekers, denied passing himself off as a student and said that the stories of his latest tall tales had come from students getting confused after too many drinks. He stated: "I have been trying to recruit people for the company I work for but I have not been trying to do anything other than help. It's true I asked one girl about getting a disclosure but I was genuinely trying to help her along too."

See also
 Wikipedia Signpost article describing how the hoax was discovered and removed
 Alan McIlwraith's Wikipedia article as of 10 October 2005
 Reliability of Wikipedia – This article looks at some of the issues raised by open content editing.

References

External links
"Captain Sir Alan KBE – call-centre worker",  The Guardian, 12 April 2006
"CAPTAIN BOGUS", The Mirror, 13 April 2006
The Guardian – My great escape from Glasgow estate: fake army hero tells story, 25 July 2006
 Cara Page, "You shall not go to the ball, 'Sir Alan'", The Daily Record, 15 April 2006.

1978 births
Living people
People from Glasgow
Impostors
Hoaxes in the United Kingdom
2005 hoaxes
Internet hoaxes
Wikipedia controversies